The 1982–83 English Hockey League season took place from September 1982 until May 1983.

The principal event for men was the National Inter League Championship which brought together the winners of their respective regional leagues. The Men's championship was won by Slough

The Men's Cup was won by Neston and the Women's Cup was won by Slough.

Men's Truman National Inter League Championship 
(Held at Eastcote, May 7–8)

Group A

Group B

Final 

Slough
Paul Loudon, Steve Partington, John Allen, Kartar Davatwal, Brajinder Daved, Avtar Singh Matharu, S Davatwal, Ken Partington, Balwant Saini (Gurdial Davatwal sub), Ravinder Laly, Ahmed Maqsood
Fareham
Kevin Burge, P Burd, P Hastings, Derek Bradbury, M Farmer, T Lawson, N Eves, Chris Kirkham, Colin Bradbury (Nigel Cook sub), A Atkins, P Jones

Men's Cup (Rank Xerox National Clubs Championship)

Quarter-finals

Semi-finals 

 *Neston won on penalty strokes

Final 
(Apr 17, St Albans)

Neston
Pete Wise, Colin Cubley, Phil McKeown, John Royce, Malcolm Wilkinson, Stan Stannard, Tony Pickthall, Steve Greene, Robbie Smith, Pete Renshaw, David Church
Slough
Paul Loudon, Paul Barber, Manjit Flora, Steve Partington, Brajinder Daved, Avtar Singh Matharu, Ken Partington, Balwant Saini, Bhaji Flora, Ravinder Laly, Kuki Dhak

Women's Cup (National Clubs Championship) 
(Oakham School, Oakham, Rutland, April 9–10)

References 

1982
field hockey
field hockey
1983 in field hockey
1982 in field hockey